Gran Hermano: El Reencuentro is the first season of the Spanish reality show El Reencuentro and the first All-Stars season of the reality show Gran Hermano. It premiered on February 3, 2010, and concluded March 30, 2010.

On January 31, 2010, during the last episode of El Debate for Gran Hermano 11, Gran Hermano host Mercedes Milá confirmed that the Gran Hermano house was going to open again just one week after the finale, this time with the former housemates from previous seasons of Gran Hermano.

The format for this season involves the housemates working in pairs that correspond to the season of Gran Hermano they were previously on. This is similar to the twist used on Big Brother 9 U.S. The show was originally intended to run for only a month but was extended to 56 days due to high ratings. Days 35, 42 and 49, in particular, all received a viewership of under 3 million viewers.

Format
Gran Hermano: El Reencuentro takes place a week after the end of Gran Hermano 11, therefore the house of this season is the same that the used to the Gran Hermano 11 with the name of Spy House or "Ecological House". The production and the studio have not experienced any change.

Initially, to the contest had to be played by old contestants of Gran Hermano. The contestants need to had conflicts or "pending accounts" with somebody of their respective editions to take part in All-Stars season. Then the show presents a new mechanical: work in the couple. In addition, there will be no nomination: the public will save 3 couples on the official website of Telecinco. These 3 couples will choose which couple to evict.

Housemates
Two days after the premiere, Nacho and Desireé walked for health problems of their son. To replace the couple, and with the purpose to extend the duration of the contest, two new couples entered the game: Pepe and Raquel and Inma and Beatriz, all from Gran Hermano 7.

A week after the premiere, Arturo was ejected from the show for aggressive behaviors to his partner Indhira. The program gave Indhira the opportunity to continue on the show with a new partner or to abandon the show, in 24 hours. After thinking about it the girl decided to walk with the fear of having to suffer from her housemates.

Two weeks after the premiere, Bea was ejected for aggressive behaviors towards Melania. Nicky continued on the show only until the Gala show, after he received his new partner Cristal. Nicky and Cristal were evicted during the Gala show.

During week 4's Gala show, Melania and Piero made their decision to walked from the show. Jorge Berrocal and María José Galera, from Gran Hermano 1 entered the house. In the same Gala show, Amor and the Andalla were ejected.

On March 11, María José decides to leave for the problem of his kidney. Jorge partnered with Silvia.

Ainhoa
Ainhoa entered the house on Day 1. She was a housemate from Gran Hermano 5. She and Nico were evicted on the Final Day 56 and came third.

Almudena
Almudena entered the house on Day 14. She was a housemate from Gran Hermano 10. Almudena, and her partner Ana, were evicted on Day 49 where upon entering the studio for their interview were welcomed with a winner's reception.

Amor
Amor entered the house on Day 14. She was the first housemate to be evicted from Gran Hermano 9. Amor was evicted, along with partner Andallá, on Day 28.

Ana
Ana entered the house on Day 14. She was a housemate from Gran Hermano 10. Ana, and her partner Almudena, were evicted on Day 49 where upon entering the studio for their interview were welcomed with a winner's reception.

Andallá
Andallá entered the house on Day 14. He was a housemate from Gran Hermano 9. Andallá was evited, along with partner Amor, on Day 28.

Arturo
Arturo entered the house on Day 1. He was a Gran Hermano 11 housemate where he had an on and off relationship with Indhira. He was ejected on Day 8 after throwing a glass of wine on top of Indhira's food after a fight they had; although Arturo and Indhira were pairs for this edition, Indhira stayed in the house, until the next day when she decided to voluntarily leave the house.

Bea, "La Legionaria"
Bea entered the house on Day 1. She was on Gran Hermano 6. In the early hours of Day 17, she was ejected after insulting and threatening Melania. She, along with Nicky, were one of the likely contenders to win.

Beatriz
Beatriz entered the house on Day 7. She was on Gran Hermano 7. She was evicted one week later on Day 14 with partner Inma.

Cristal
Cristal entered the house on Day 21. She was on Gran Hermano 6. She entered the house to replace Bea as she was ejected a few days prior and to become Nicky's new partner. After about an hour in the house, Cristal made Gran Hermano history as she became the first housemate to be evicted within' the Gala, and overall third pair to be evicted, with Nicky.

Dani
Dani entered the house on Day 35. He was on Gran Hermano 8. After only one week in the house, he was evicted on Day 42.

Desirée
Desirée entered the house on Day 1. She was on Gran Hermano 4 where she formed a relationship with Nacho which ended sometime after their season ended. She walked from the house along with Nacho on Day 3 due to their child becoming ill.

Indhira
Indhira entered the house on Day 1. She was a housemate from Gran Hermano 11 where she had an on and off relationship with Arturo. After exiting the GH11 House, she started a blog on the official website of Telecinco called El Blog de Indhira (Indhira's Blog). On Day 8, Arturo was ejected after having a confrontation between them and he threw a glass of wine on top of her meal. This decision did not affect her stay in the house at all and would have received a new partner during the next Gala. On Day 9, she walked out of the House after thinking of who could be her new partner and she said that it would be the right thing to do.

Inma
Inma entered the house on Day 7. She was a housemate from Gran Hermano 7. She was evicted with partner Beatriz on Day 14.

Gema
Gema entered the house on Day 35. She was a housemate from Gran Hermano 10. She entered in Gran Hermano 10 with her husband, Carlos F. Gema, and her partner Orlando, were evicted on Day 49.

Jorge
Jorge entered the house on Day 28. He was a housemate from Gran Hermano 1. On Day 37, his partner Maria José left the house; on Day 42, he got a new partner, Silvia. He and Silvia were evicted at the Final Day 56 and came the runners-up.

Maria José
Maria José entered the house on Day 28. She was the first evictee on Gran Hermano 1. On Day 37, she walked out of the house due to an illness, leaving Jorge as a single competitor until the Gala of Day 42 where Silvia was named as his new partner, also from GH1.

Marusky
Marusky entered the house on Day 35. She was on Gran Hermano 8. She was evicted one week later, on Day 42.

Melania
Melania entered the house on Day 1. He was a housemate from Gran Hermano 9 where he formed a relationship with Piero. After months of relationship, they ended the relationship. On Day 28, she walked out of the house with Piero.

Nacho
Nacho entered the house on Day 1. He was a housemate from Gran Hermano 4 where he formed a relationship with Desirée and fathered a son with her; their relationship ended sometime after their season ended. He abandoned the house on Day 3, along with Desirée due to their child becoming ill.

Nicky
Nicky entered the house on Day 1. He was a housemate from Gran Hermano 6 who first held the Gran Hermano record of the highest eviction percentage, which was broken in Gran Hermano 9 by Ángela. He was paired with fellow GH6 housemate Bea until Day 17 when she was ejected. On Day 21, his new partner, Cristal joined the game and later on were evicted.

Nicola
Nico entered the house on Day 1. He was a housemate from Gran Hermano 5. He and Ainhoa were evicted on the Final Day 56 and came third.

Noemí
Noemí entered the house on Day 1. She was a housemate from Gran Hermano 3. After leaving the reality show, Noemí married Raquel M., her friend in that series. After several years of relationship, they were divorced. Noemí, along with Raquel M., was evicted in a surprise eviction on Day 7.

Orlando
Orlando entered the house on Day 35. He was a housemate from Gran Hermano 10. Orlando, and his partner Gema, were evicted on Day 49.

Pepe
Pepe entered the house on Day 7. He is the winner from Gran Hermano 7 with the highest winning percentage of any season in Gran Hermano with 87.2%. He and Raquel L. won this season with 55.2% of the votes.

Piero
Piero entered the house on Day 1. He was a housemate from Gran Hermano 9 where he formed a relationship with Melania. After months of relationship, they broke up. He and Melania left the House on Day 28.

Raquel L.
Raquel López entered the house on Day 7. She was a housemate from Gran Hermano 7. She and Pepe won this season with 55.2% of the votes.

Raquel M.
Raquel Morillas entered the house on Day 1. She was a housemate from Gran Hermano 3. After leaving the reality show, Raquel M. married Noemí, her friend in that series. After several years of relationship, they divorced. Raquel M., along with Noemí was evicted in a surprise eviction on Day 7.

Silvia
Silvia entered the house on Day 42. She was a housemate from Gran Hermano 1 replacing Maria José. She and Jorge were evicted at the Final Day 56 and came the runners-up.

Nominations table

Notes

  For the first round of nominations, the public was voting for the top three pairs to be immune from being nominated for eviction. The two pairs with the fewest save votes from the public will face possible eviction as the immune housemates/pairs will decide to either evict or save them. Ainhoa & Nico of Gran Hermano 5 and Noemi & Raquel M. from Gran Hermano 3 received the fewest public votes, hence were nominated for eviction. 
  For this week's nominations, the public is voting for the pair they want to be immune from nomination. 
  As the housemates are working in pairs, Arturo & Indhira represented Gran Hermano 11. On Day 8, Arturo was ejected from the house and Indhira stayed as GH would have brought in a new partner for her, however, on Day 9, Indhira voluntarily left the house. Arturo & Indhira's exit did not affect the public vote for immunity for Week 2. 
  As the housemates are working in pairs, Bea & Nicky represented Gran Hermano 6. On Day 17, Bea was ejected from the house and Nicky remained as the sole player for GH6 until Day 21 as GH would have brought in a new partner for him (Cristal). Bea's exit did not affect the public vote for immunity for Week 3. 
  For this week's eviction, the three saved teams voted to save a couple. 
  There were no nominations or eviction for Week 5, instead the Gala featured the entrances of two new pairs: GH8's Marusky & Dani and GH10's Gemma and Orlando. 
  For this week's eviction, the three pairs with the fewest votes were nominated for eviction and the two saved pairs were broken up where Gran Hermano asked the four housemates who they want to save. 
  As of the conclusion of the Gala of Week 7 and all of Week 8, the public is voting of the Housemates-pair they want to win.

Audiences

External links
 Gran Hermano Official Website at Telecinco

See also
 Main Article about the show

2010 Spanish television seasons
All Stars 1